Gdynia Aquarium is a public aquarium and sea museum operated by the National Marine Fisheries Research Institute in Gdynia, Poland. Previously called the Oceanographic Museum and Sea Aquarium of the Sea Fisheries Institute in Gdynia (1971-2003), the aquarium has a zoological garden status and is situated along Aleja John Paul II on the South Pier.

The museum has operated since 21 June 1971, although attempts were made to establish it in the 1920s and 1930s.

Exhibitions presented within the museum are on oceanography and hydrobiology, while the aquarium contains both sea and freshwater flora and fauna.

Educational activities were developed during exhibition modernizations. In 2005, a Cinema-Conference Hall was unveiled, as were rooms equipped with microscopes and computer equipment for conducting laboratory activities. In 2007 a Wet Room was opened - a place where one can put their hands into an open-top aquarium tank and touch fish. The Marine Education Section was expanded with a Preschool Room full of soft marine toys, which is very frequently visited by the youngest school children.

Gdynia Aquarium Animals 
A total of 215 species from 61 families, including:
 142 fish species,
 3 amphibian species,
 12 reptiles species,
 58 invertebrates species;

Number of families represented in each group:
 fish – 48,
 reptiles – 3,
 amphibian – 1,
 invertebrates – 9.

References 
 Gdynia Aquarium Official Website (in English and Polish]

External links
 Official Gdynia Aquarium Web site

Aquaria in Poland
Buildings and structures in Gdynia
Tourist attractions in Pomeranian Voivodeship
Museums in Pomeranian Voivodeship
Natural history museums in Poland
Articles needing infobox zoo
Fishing in Poland